American rapper Jaden Smith has released three studio albums, three mixtapes, three extended plays, 16 singles (including five singles as a featured artist) and 28 music videos. In 2010, Smith collaborated with singer Justin Bieber on the song "Never Say Never", which peaked at number eight on the US Billboard Hot 100 and later becoming certified 5× platinum by the RIAA. Smith released his debut mixtape, The Cool Cafe: Cool Tape Vol. 1, in October 2012, which was followed up by CTV2, a sequel to his mixtape, on November 18, 2014. He then released a three-track collaborative EP with producer Daniel D'artiste titled This Is the Album in February 2015.

On December 1, 2016, Smith re-released CTV2, and three days later he released the music video for "Fallen", the lead single from his debut studio album Syre. The album was released on November 17, 2017, and debuted at number 24 on the US Billboard 200. The album spawned the singles: "Fallen", "Batman", "Watch Me", "Falcon" and "Icon". He later followed up with Syre: The Electric Album, in July 2018 and The Sunset Tapes: A Cool Tape Story, in November 2018.

In April 2019, Smith released a three track EP titled Erys Is Coming. Smith later released his second studio album, Erys, on July 5, 2019, and debuted at number 12 on the US Billboard 200. The album spawned the single: "Again".

His most recent album, CTV3: Cool Tape Vol. 3, was released August 28, 2020.

Albums

Studio albums

Mixtapes

Extended plays

Singles

As lead artist

As featured artist

Other charted songs

Guest appearances

Music videos

Notes

References

Discographies of American artists
Hip hop discographies